The brilliant ground agama (Trapelus agilis) is a species of agama found in Central, West and South Asia, in Iran, Pakistan, India, Russia, Turkmenistan, Tajikistan, Uzbekistan, Kazakhstan, China, possibly Iraq, and Afghanistan (T. a. isolepis).

Race khuzistanensis: Type locality: Iran, Khuzistan Province, 5 km northwest of Haft-Gel on the road to Shushtar
Race pakistanensis - southeastern Pakistan and adjacent northwestern India: Type locality: Gaj-River, Kirthar Range, southeastern Pakistan

References

 Anderson S. C. 1966 The lectotype of Agama isolepis Boulenger. Herpetologica 22: 230–231.
 Boulenger, G.A. 1885 Catalogue of the Lizards in the British Museum (Nat. Hist.) I. Geckonidae, Eublepharidae, Uroplatidae, Pygopodidae, Agamidae. London: 450 pp.
 Boulenger, G.A. 1887 A list of the reptiles and batrachians obtained near Muscat, Arabia, and presented to the British Museum by Surgeon-Major A.S.G. Jayakar. Ann. Mag. Nat. Hist. (5) 20: 407-408
 Olivier 1807 Voy. Emp. Otho. 4: 394

External links
 

Trapelus
Lizards of Asia
Reptiles of Central Asia
Reptiles of Afghanistan
Reptiles of China
Reptiles of Iran
Reptiles of Pakistan
Reptiles of Russia
Taxa named by Guillaume-Antoine Olivier
Reptiles described in 1807